National nature reserves in Suffolk, England are established by Natural England and managed by them or by non-governmental organisations such as the Royal Society for the Protection of Birds, the National Trust or the Suffolk Wildlife Trust.

List of reserves 
A list of national nature reserves in Suffolk:

Benacre NNR - in The Broads National Park
Bradfield Woods NNR
Cavenham Heath
Orfordness-Havergate NNR
Redgrave and Lopham Fen NNR (shared between Norfolk and Suffolk)
Thetford Heath NNR
Walberswick NNR
Westleton Heath NNR

See also
List of Sites of Special Scientific Interest in Suffolk
List of Local Nature Reserves in Suffolk
Suffolk Wildlife Trust

References 

 Suffolk